Pleurofusia dowlingi is an extinct species of sea snail, a marine gastropod mollusk in the family Drilliidae.

Description
The length of the shell attains 26 mm.

Distribution
This extinct marine species was found in Oligocene strata of west central Florida, USA; age range: 33.9 to 28.4 Ma.

References

 E. J. Petuch. 1997. A new gastropod fauna from an Oligocene back-reef lagoonal environment in west central Florida. The Nautilus 110(4):122–138

External links

dowlingi
Gastropods described in 1997